Josip Rumac (born 26 October 1994 in Rijeka) is a Croatian cyclist, who currently rides for UCI ProTeam . In October 2020, he was named in the startlist for the 2020 Giro d'Italia.

Major results

2011
 National Junior Road Championships
1st  Road race
1st  Time trial
2012
 2nd GP dell'Arno
 3rd  Road race, UCI Junior Road World Championships
 3rd Giro del Mendrisiotto
2013
 3rd Time trial, National Road Championships
 9th Time trial, Mediterranean Games
2014
 2nd Time trial, National Road Championships
2015
 1st  Road race, National Under-23 Road Championships
 2nd Road race, National Road Championships
 7th Trofej Umag
 9th Road race, UEC European Under-23 Road Championships
2016
 2nd Road race, National Road Championships
 2nd Time trial, National Under-23 Road Championships
 3rd Giro del Belvedere
 5th Trofej Umag
 10th GP Izola
2017
 1st  Road Race, National Road Championships
 5th Trofeo Alcide Degasperi
 6th GP Izola
 9th Poreč Trophy
 10th Overall Tour du Maroc
1st  Mountains classification
2018
 1st  Time trial, National Road Championships
 9th Trofej Umag
2019
 National Road Championships
1st  Road race
1st  Time trial
2020
 National Road Championships
1st  Road race
1st  Time trial

Grand Tour general classification results timeline

References

External links

1994 births
Living people
Croatian male cyclists
Sportspeople from Rijeka
European Games competitors for Croatia
Cyclists at the 2015 European Games
Competitors at the 2013 Mediterranean Games
Mediterranean Games competitors for Croatia
Olympic cyclists of Croatia
Cyclists at the 2020 Summer Olympics
21st-century Croatian people